David McAdam Eccles, 1st Viscount Eccles  (18 September 1904 – 24 February 1999), was an English Conservative politician.

Education and early career
Eccles was educated at Winchester College and New College, Oxford, where he obtained a second-class degree in PPE. He worked with the Central Mining Corporation in London and Johannesburg. During the Second World War he worked for the Ministry of Economic Warfare from 1939 to 1940 and for the Ministry of Production from 1942 to 1943 and was Economic Adviser to the British ambassadors at Lisbon and Madrid from 1940 to 1942.

Political career
Eccles was elected as Member of Parliament (MP) for Chippenham in a wartime by-election in 1943, a seat he held until 1962. He served in the Conservative administrations of Churchill, Eden and Macmillan respectively as Minister of Works from 1951 to 1954 (in which position he helped organise the 1953 Coronation and was appointed KCVO), as Minister of Education from 1954 to 1957 and again from 1959 to 1962 and as President of the Board of Trade from 1957 to 1959. Eccles was also President of the Board of Trade in January 1957.

In 1962 he was raised to the peerage as Baron Eccles, of Chute in the County of Wiltshire, and in 1964 he was created Viscount Eccles, of Chute in the County of Wiltshire. Lord Eccles returned to the government in 1970 when Edward Heath appointed him Paymaster-General and Minister for the Arts, a post he held until 1973. As Minister for the Arts he clashed with the Chairman of the Arts Council of Great Britain Arnold Goodman over the funding of controversial plays and exhibitions and introduced mandatory admission charges at public museums and galleries. Lord Eccles was made a Doctor of Science (DSc) in 1966 by Loughborough University. He also received an Honorary Science Doctorate from the University of Bath in 1972.

Personal life
Eccles married, firstly, the Hon. Sybil Frances Dawson (1904–1977), daughter of Bertrand Dawson, 1st Viscount Dawson of Penn, on 1 October 1929. They had three children:

 The Hon. John Dawson Eccles; later 2nd Viscount Eccles (born 1931).
 The Hon. Simon Dawson Eccles (born 1934).
 The Hon. Selina Eccles (born 1937); m. firstly Robin Andrew Duthac Carnegie (grandson of Charles Carnegie, 10th Earl of Southesk); m. secondly George Petty-FitzMaurice, 8th Marquess of Lansdowne; became The Marchioness of Lansdowne.

A collection of the couple's wartime letters were published under the title By Safe Hand: Letters of Sybil & David Eccles 1939-42 (Bodley Head, 1983).

Widowed in 1977, he married again, this time to book collector and philanthropist Mary Morley Crapo Hyde (1912–2003) on 26 September 1984. He died in 1999 at the age of 94, at home of natural causes, leaving an estate of approximately £2.4 million.

Styles and honours

 Mr David Eccles (1904–1943)
 Mr David Eccles MP (1943–1953)
 Sir David Eccles KCVO MP (1953–1962)
 The Rt. Hon. The Lord Eccles KCVO PC (1962–1964)
 The Rt. Hon. The Viscount Eccles KCVO PC (1964–1984)
 The Rt. Hon. The Viscount Eccles CH KCVO PC (1984–1999)

Notes

References

Mary, Viscountess Eccles: obituary, The Independent, 5 September 2003

External links 
 
 

1904 births
1999 deaths
Alumni of New College, Oxford
British Secretaries of State for Education
Conservative Party (UK) MPs for English constituencies
Knights Commander of the Royal Victorian Order
Members of the Order of the Companions of Honour
Members of the Privy Council of the United Kingdom
Ministers in the Eden government, 1955–1957
Ministers in the Macmillan and Douglas-Home governments, 1957–1964
Ministers in the third Churchill government, 1951–1955
People educated at Winchester College
Presidents of the Board of Trade
UK MPs 1935–1945
UK MPs 1945–1950
UK MPs 1950–1951
UK MPs 1951–1955
UK MPs 1955–1959
UK MPs 1959–1964
UK MPs who were granted peerages
United Kingdom Paymasters General
Viscounts created by Elizabeth II